Kirill Andreyevich Volchkov (born 21 March 1996) is a Russian football player. He plays for Ryazan.

Club career
He made his debut for the main squad of FC Kuban Krasnodar on 23 September 2015 in a Russian Cup game against FC Shinnik Yaroslavl. He came on as a substitute in the 77th minute and scored a winning goal in the 85th minute as Kuban advanced to the Round of 16.

Lori
On 3 August 2018, Volchkov signed for newly promoted Armenian Premier League club Lori FC on a contract until the end of the year. On 31 October 2018, Volchkov left Lori by mutual consent.

SpVgg Vreden
Ahead of the 2019–20 season, Volchkov joined German club SpVgg Vreden.

References

External links
 

1996 births
Sportspeople from Smolensk
Living people
Russian footballers
Association football midfielders
FC Kuban Krasnodar players
Armenian Premier League players
Russian expatriate footballers
Russian expatriate sportspeople in Armenia
Expatriate footballers in Armenia
Russian expatriate sportspeople in Germany
Expatriate footballers in Germany